Battle Creek Transit is the primary provider of mass transportation in Calhoun County, Michigan, United States. Eight Routes provide service from Monday through Saturday. In 2007, all buses were equipped with bike racks. Nearly 500 designated stops are available within the system. Current service times area 5:15am – 6:45pm Monday-Friday, 9:15am – 5:15pm Saturday. No service on Sunday or major holidays.

Route list & Details

References

External links 
 BCT page at the City of Battle Creek's Official Website

Battle Creek, Michigan
Bus transportation in Michigan
Transportation in Calhoun County, Michigan